Hopper-Snyder Homestead is a historic home located at Delaware Township, Northumberland County, Pennsylvania.  It was built about 1800, and is a -story, five bay by two bay, rectangular stone dwelling with a wood-frame addition.  It has a gable roof and interior stone chimney.

It was added to the National Register of Historic Places in 1979.

References

Houses on the National Register of Historic Places in Pennsylvania
Houses completed in 1800
Houses in Northumberland County, Pennsylvania
National Register of Historic Places in Northumberland County, Pennsylvania